Pasion morena (Morena) is a Mexican telenovela by TV Azteca. It premiered in 2009. The protagonists are Victor González and Paola Núñez. Other actors include Anette Michel, Fernando Ciangherotti, Ari Telch and Evangelina Elizondo. The series also marks the return of Victor Gonzalez and Anette Michel to TV Azteca.

Cast

Main cast
 Victor González - Leo Hernandez/Fernando Sirenio
 Paola Núñez - Morena Madrigal Rueda vda. de Salomon
 Anette Michel - Emilia Dumont/Cassandra Rodriguez
 Fernando Ciangherotti - Aldo Sirenio
 Ari Telch - LLamita/Flavio Sirenio
 Evangelina Elizondo - Josefina Sirenio

Main supporting cast
 María Renée Prudencio - Elena Sirenio
 Andrea Noli - Silvia Rueda
 Víctor Huggo Martin - Roberto Cárdenas
 Segundo Cernadas - Oscar Salomón
 Alberto Guerra - Ramiro Negrete/El Diablo 
Special Participation
 José Alonso - Adolfo Rueda
 Javier Gómez - Lucio Sirenio
 Fernando Sarfati

Supporting casts
 Amaranta Ruíz - Viviana
 Erika de la Rosa - Isela Teran
 Lambda García - Gustavo "Gus-Gus" Sirenio
 María Fernanda Quiroz - Jazmín
 Alejandro Lukini - Ernesto "Neto" Rodriguez
 Sergio Bonilla - Jesús "Chucho"
 Juan Valentín - Pedro Hernández
 Antonio Gaona - Ángel
 Marcela Guirado - Georgia Madrigal
 Flavio Peniche - "El perro" Salazar
 Enrique Muñoz - Julio
 Silvia Santoyo - Luisa
 Mar Carrera - Gloria
Special Participation
 Salvador Hurtado
 Rolando De La Mora - "El guero"
 Martin Navarrete - Dr. Fernandez
 Jair de Rubin - "Polo"
 Emmanuel Morales - "El Chaleco"
 Sebastian Ferrat
 Hector Garibay

References

2009 telenovelas
2009 Mexican television series debuts
2010 Mexican television series endings
Mexican telenovelas
TV Azteca telenovelas
Mexican television series based on Argentine television series
Spanish-language telenovelas